The national symbols of Serbia are things which are emblematic, representative or otherwise characteristic of Serbia and the Serbian people or Serbian culture. Some are established, official symbols; for example, the Coat of arms of Serbia, which has been codified in heraldry. Other symbols may not have official status, for one reason or another, but are likewise recognised at a national or international level.

Official symbols

Other symbols

See also
Serbs
National identity of Serbia
List of World Heritage sites in Serbia

References

External links

 

 
Serbian culture
History of the Serbs